Dario Brose (born January 27, 1970, in New York City) is a retired American soccer player who spent eight seasons in Europe, three in Major League Soccer and one in the USL First Division.  He has also coached the Mid-Michigan Bucks of the Premier Development League.

Youth
Dario played his high school soccer for Roy C. Ketcham High School in Wappinger, New York under the direction of coach Jeff Behnke. In 1986 he won the Capital Cup tournament's under-19 championship with New York side Blau Weiss Gottschee of Ridgewood, Queens.
Brose played college soccer for North Carolina State University and was named All-American in 1990. That year, the Wolfpack made it to the Final Four. Brose graduated in 1991 with two teammates, Roy Lassiter and Henry Gutierrez, who also had successful professional careers. Another teammate on the Wolfpack, Scott Schweitzer, coached Brose with the Carolina RailHawks. Brose then teamed up with Chris Carrieri who also played in Major League Soccer with Brose for the San Jose Earthquakes.

Professional
After graduation, Brose moved to Europe. There he played with Stade Briochin in France, and FC Saarbrücken in Germany. He established himself as a solid midfielder during his time in Germany. Brose returned to the United States in 1999 to join the San Jose Clash of the MLS. In 2000, he appeared in the All-Star Game. He played his last season in 2001, the year San Jose (since renamed the Earthquakes) won their first championship. He played only one game that year. In 2007, Brose signed with the Carolina RailHawks of the USL-1. He played one game, then retired permanently. Brose then teamed up with Chris Carrieri who also played in the MLS with Brose for the San Jose Earthquakes.

National team
Brose played for the U.S. U-18, U-20, U-23 and Senior men's teams. This included the U.S. team at the 1992 Summer Olympics in Barcelona and the 1989 FIFA U-20 World Cup in Saudi Arabia.

Brose earned four caps for the U.S. national team. He scored one goal during his time with the national team.

Coaching
After his initial retirement from active playing, Brose worked as a staff coach for the Silicon Valley Football Club.  On May 1, 2002, the Mid-Michigan Bucks of the Premier Development League hired Brose.  He took the team to a 12-5-3 record in his single season with the club.  He has also worked as the Director of Youth Development and U-12 girls team of the Triangle Futbol Club. Then he left Triangle Futbol Club (TFC) and went to Carolina Soccer Club. Where he coached U-12 first division boys and U-13 second division boys.

In 2010 Dario left Carolina Soccer Club and coached U-12 & U-13 1st division boys teams with Triangle United Soccer Association (TUSA) based out of Chapel Hill, North Carolina.  His stint was short lived, and in 2011 he left Triangle United and began coaching with Fuquay Varina Athletic Association (FVAA) out of Fuquay-Varina, North Carolina.

Coach Brose led a talented team of 2002 boys named "NC Elite" to the SuperCupNI Globe division Championship in 2019 emerging victorious against a strong Celtic FC 02 team (Scottish FA Youth Cup Finalist 2019) in a 2:1 Win. NC Elite finished higher in the 2019 SuperCupNI Premier Section standings (2002 and younger) than all other North American, South American, and Asian teams.

References

External links
 

1970 births
Living people
All-American men's college soccer players
American soccer coaches
American soccer players
American expatriate soccer players
NC State Wolfpack men's soccer players
1. FC Saarbrücken players
San Jose Earthquakes players
Olympic soccer players of the United States
Footballers at the 1992 Summer Olympics
United States men's international soccer players
North Carolina State University alumni
USL First Division players
North Carolina FC players
Major League Soccer players
Major League Soccer All-Stars
Stade Briochin players
United States men's youth international soccer players
United States men's under-20 international soccer players
United States men's under-23 international soccer players
Soccer players from New York City
Wappinger, New York
Association football midfielders
Roy C. Ketcham High School alumni
Pan American Games gold medalists for the United States
Pan American Games medalists in football
Medalists at the 1991 Pan American Games
Footballers at the 1991 Pan American Games